Shakeel Ahmed Yousuf Abdul Razack Mohamed (born on 25 August 1968) is a Mauritian Barrister and politician.

Early life, family and education
Mohamed is the son of Yousuf Mohamed, former MP and Minister who is himself the son of Indian born-Mauritian Minister Abdool Razack Mohamed with his second wife, Ghislaine Ducasse.

Shakeel Mohamed is an alumnus of the Collège du Saint-Esprit where he was also head of the Debate Club.

Mohamed is an alumnus of the University of Buckingham, where he studied law. He was called to the Bar of England and Wales in 1990 by the Middle Temple Inns of Court.

Political career
Mohamed started his political career as a member of the Militant Socialist Movement (MSM) and was a candidate of the MSM-RMM alliance at the December 1995 National Assembly elections in Constituency No.2 (Port Louis South and Port Louis Central) but he was not elected with 14.8% of votes. He was a member of the MSM of Anerood Jugnauth but later disagreed with him on policy issues.

At the September 2000 National Assembly elections Shakeel Mohamed was candidate in Constituency No.3 (Port Louis Maritime and Port Louis East) of the party called Comité d'Action Mauricien, which was different from the original Comité d'Action Musulman (CAM). However he was again not elected and received 11.2% of votes. He then resigned from MSM and joined the Labour Party in 2000.

At the July 2005 National Assembly elections Shakeel Mohamed was candidate of Alliance Sociale (Labour-PMXD-VF-MR-MMSM) in Constituency No.13 (Rivière des Anguilles and Souillac) and was elected for the first time with 49.3% of votes.

At the May 2010 National Assembly elections he was candidate of the Labour-PMSD-MSM coalition in Constituency No.3 (Port Louis Maritime and Port Louis East) and was elected for the second time with 40.2% of votes. He was appointed as Minister in the cabinet of Navin Ramgoolam from 2010 to 2014.

At the December 2014 National Assembly elections he was candidate of the Labour-MMM coalition in Constituency No.3 (Port Louis Maritime and Port Louis East) and was elected for the third time with 44.6% of votes. Shakeel was a member of the Opposition from 2014 to 2019. He became the Leader of the Labour Party Parliamentary Group when party leader Navin Ramgoolam was not elected to parliament in 2014.

In 2019 Shakeel was candidate of Alliance Nationale (Labour-PMSD) at the November 2019 National Assembly elections in Constituency No.3 (Port Louis Maritime and Port Louis East) and was elected for the fourth time with 52.0% of votes. Shakeel joined the Opposition again from 2019 onwards. He also became Opposition Whip and member of the Standing Orders Committee.

References

Living people
Members of the National Assembly (Mauritius)
Government ministers of Mauritius
Mauritian Muslims
Mauritian politicians of Indian descent
1968 births
21st-century politicians